Fisk is an unincorporated community or ghost town in Adair County, Iowa, United States.

History

Fisk was established near the center of Richland Township.

The first post office in Fisk was established in 1870.

By 1901, Fisk was home to a creamery (the Blue Grass Creamery), a school, and the Fisk Post Office. However, with the introduction of Rural Free Delivery, the Fisk Post Office closed. In 1918, Fisk was described thusly: "In Richland township, Adair county. 10 miles sw of Greenfield, the judicial seat, and 6 w of Orient, the nearest railroad station and banking point, whence mail is supplied by rural delivery." The directory went on to list two general stores: those of A.B. Creighton, and J.J. Perkins. 

In 1902, Fisk's population was 37, and in 1924, the population was reported as 28. 

A school and church were still located in Fisk in 1951.

References

Unincorporated communities in Adair County, Iowa
1870 establishments in Iowa
Populated places established in 1870
Unincorporated communities in Iowa